The 2014–15 Kategoria e Tretë was the 6th season of the Albanian Third Division in its current format, and 12th season as the fourth tier of football in Albania.

Participating teams
Group A 

Group B

League table

Group A

Group B

References

4
Albania
Kategoria e Tretë seasons